Rent control is part of a system of rent regulation that limits the changes that can be made in the price of renting a house or other real property.

It may also refer to:

Rent Control (1984 film)
Rent Control (2005 film)